A coxed pair is a rowing boat used in the sport of competitive rowing. It is designed for two persons who propel the boat with sweep oars and is steered by a coxswain.

The crew consists of two rowers, each having one oar, and a cox. One rower is on the stroke side (rower's right hand side) and other is on the bow side (rower's lefthand side). The cox steers the boat using a rudder and may be seated at the stern of the boat where there is a view of the crew or in the bow (known as a bowloader). With a bowloader, amplification is needed to communicate with the crew which is sitting behind, but the cox has a better view of the course and the weight distribution may help the boat go faster.  When there is no cox, the boat is referred to as a  "coxless pair".

Racing boats (often called "shells") are long, narrow, and broadly semi-circular in cross-section in order to reduce drag to a minimum.  Originally made from wood, shells are now almost always made from a composite material (usually carbon-fibre reinforced plastic) for strength and weight advantages. Pairs have a fin towards the rear, to help prevent roll and yaw and to help the rudder. The riggers are staggered alternately along the boat so that the forces apply asymmetrically to each side of the boat.

"Coxed pair" is one of the classes recognized by the International Rowing Federation. It was one of the original events in the Olympics but was dropped in 1992.

See also

Rowing at the Summer Olympics
World Rowing Championships

References

Rowing racing boats